Richard Floyd (born April 17, 1944) is an American politician who served as a former Republican member of the Tennessee House of Representatives for the 27th Assembly district, consisting of western portions of Hamilton County, from 2006 to 2014.

Biography
Richard Floyd was born on April 17, 1944, in Hamilton County. He is a former employee of Chattanooga Coca-Cola.

He is a board director for Bethel Bible Village in Hixson, Tennessee, and has been involved with the Hamilton County chapter of Big Brothers Big Sisters of America and the Fellowship of Christian Athletes. He is a Baptist. He is married with three children, and he lives in Chattanooga.

Transgender bathroom ban
In January 2012, he entered a bill into the Tennessee legislature (co-sponsored by fellow Republican Senator Bo Watson) which would ban transgender people from using dressing rooms and restrooms that do not match the gender on their birth certificates. In press reports, he was quoted threatening to  "stomp a mudhole" in any transgender woman if they came anywhere near his family. He later stated, "This bill... is intended to protect," he said. "I have a wife, three daughters, two granddaughters, and there is no way, if some man thought he was a woman and thought he had the privileged or the right to go into a women's bathroom, I would no way and stand there and allow that," adding "Don't ask me to adjust to their perverted way of thinking and put my family at risk. We cannot continue to let these people dominate how society acts and reacts. Now if somebody thinks he's a woman and he's a man and wants to try on women's clothes, let him take them into the men's bathroom or dressing room." The bill was withdrawn from the Senate by Watson after Floyd's comments were widely publicized.

Transparency
Richard Floyd refused to tell citizens where he stands on any of the issues addressed in the 2010 & 2012 Political Courage Test, despite repeated requests from Vote Smart, national media, and prominent political leaders.

References

External links 
Official website

1944 births
Living people
Republican Party members of the Tennessee House of Representatives
Politicians from Chattanooga, Tennessee
People from Hamilton County, Tennessee